The Division of Hawke is an Australian electoral division in the state of Victoria, which was contested for the first time at the 2022 Australian federal election. The electorate is centred on the localities of Bacchus Marsh, Ballan, Melton and Sunbury to the west and north-west of Melbourne.

Geography
Federal electoral division boundaries in Australia are determined at redistributions by a redistribution committee appointed by the Australian Electoral Commission. Redistributions occur for the boundaries of divisions in a particular state, and they occur every seven years, or sooner if a state's representation entitlement changes or when divisions of a state are malapportioned.

History

The division was proposed by the Australian Electoral Commission (AEC) in March 2021, which would combine several areas from the divisions of Ballarat, Gorton and McEwen to create the new federal division, to take account of the increase in population of Victoria. The seat was named in honour of Bob Hawke, the longest-serving Labor Prime Minister of Australia, who served from March 1983 to December 1991, and who represented the Division of Wills from 1980 to 1992. The new division was confirmed in June 2021 and was contested for the first time at the 2022 election.

Members

Electoral results

References

External links
 Division of Hawke - Australian Electoral Commission 

Electoral divisions of Australia
Constituencies established in 2022
2022 establishments in Australia
Bob Hawke
Sunbury, Victoria
Bacchus Marsh
Shire of Moorabool
City of Melton
City of Hume